The Outdoor Film Festival "Agreements @ DISAGREE" is a film festival in Naples, Campania region, Italy.

Film festival created by Pietro Pizzimento and by Associazione Culturale "Movies Events", held in Naples, at the Parco del Poggio, from July to September.

The Festival del Cinema all'Aperto "Accordi @ DISACCORDI" was "Arena d'essai", unique in Campania, from the General Direction for Cinema of the Italian Ministry of Heritage and Culture.

It's sponsored by the Tourism and Major Events Department of the City of Naples and is part of the initiatives of "Summer in Naples."

The exhibition is one of the festival of independent thicker, has a programming most significant films of the season just ended, together with the compilation of the most significant works of contemporary authors or works that have not had adequate distribution of both national and international authors.

Editions 
 Festival del Cinema all'Aperto "Accordi @ DISACCORDI" I Edition from July to September 2000
 Festival del Cinema all'Aperto "Accordi @ DISACCORDI" II Edition from July to September 2001
 Festival del Cinema all'Aperto "Accordi @ DISACCORDI" III Edition from July to September 2002
 Festival del Cinema all'Aperto "Accordi @ DISACCORDI" IV Edition from July to September 2003
 Festival del Cinema all'Aperto "Accordi @ DISACCORDI" V Edition from 6 July to 5 September 2004
 Festival del Cinema all'Aperto "Accordi @ DISACCORDI" VI Edition from July to September 2005
 Festival del Cinema all'Aperto "Accordi @ DISACCORDI" VII Edition from 21 July to 12 September 2006
 Festival del Cinema all'Aperto "Accordi @ DISACCORDI" VIII Edition from July to September 2007
 Festival del Cinema all'Aperto "Accordi @ DISACCORDI" IX Edition from 10 July to 16 September 2008
 Festival del Cinema all'Aperto "Accordi @ DISACCORDI" X Edition from 2 July to 13 September 2009
 Festival del Cinema all'Aperto "Accordi @ DISACCORDI" XI Edition from 15 July to 8 September 2010

See also 
 Film Festival
 List of film festivals in Italy
 List of film festivals in Europe
 List of film festivals in the World

References

External links 
Official web site
XI Outdoor Film Festival in "Summer in Naples"i
Movies under the stars, is the summer of cinephiles
Outdoor Film Festival

Film festivals in Italy